The  is a kofun burial mound located in the city of Gyōda, Saitama Prefecture, in the Kantō region of Japan. The tumulus was designated a National Historic Site in 1938 and re-designated as a Special National Historic Site of Japan in 2020 as part of the Sakitama Kofun Cluster.

Overview
The Kawarazuka Kofun has a total length of 73 meters, and is the sixth largest tumulus in the Saitama Kofun Cluster. As with the other keyhole-shaped tumuli in this cluster, the Kawarazuka Kofun had a rectangular double moat. A large number of haniwa have beenexcavated from this tumulus, including haniwa shaped as houses, waterfowl, men with shields, boys playing musical instruments leading horses, and girls with necklaces, from which a glimpse of the clothes, hairstyles, and festivals of the Kofun period can be deduced. The tumulus dates from the first half of the 6th century AD.

Overall length 73 meters
Posterior circular portion 36.5 meter diameter x 5.1 meter high
Anterior rectangular portion 47 meters wide x 4.9 meters high

See also
List of Historic Sites of Japan (Saitama)

References

External links

Gyoda city home page 
Museum of the Sakitama Ancient Burial Mounds 

Kofun
Archaeological sites in Japan
History of Saitama Prefecture
Gyōda
Historic Sites of Japan